Lobrathium is a genus of beetles belonging to the family Staphylinidae.

The species of this genus are found in Europe, Japan and America.

Species:
 Lobrathium ablectum Assing, 2012 
 Lobrathium abyssinum (Cameron, 1947)

References

Staphylinidae
Staphylinidae genera